Louis Thomas was a French writer, born in Perpignan in 1885 and dying in Brussels in 1962.
In 1909 he married the mezzo-soprano Raymonde Delaunois.

1885 births
1962 deaths
People from Perpignan
20th-century French novelists
French male novelists
20th-century French male writers
French male non-fiction writers
20th-century French journalists